Stevens is an unincorporated community and census-designated place (CDP) in Lancaster County, Pennsylvania, United States. As of the 2010 census it had a population of 612. The Stevens post office has ZIP code 17578. 

The community was named in honor of Thaddeus Stevens. It was originally also called "Reamstown Station", due to its being the closest railroad station to the much larger community of Reamstown. By 1899, the community was just referred to as Stevens P.O.

The Schoeneck and Reamstown Elementary Schools, in the Cocalico School District, have Stevens addresses, as do several churches and the Mount Airy Kennels.

Geography
Stevens is in northern Lancaster County, on the border between East and West Cocalico townships. The township boundary follows North Line Road and South Line Road, which crosses Main Street at the center of town. Stevens is bordered to the north by the borough of Denver and to the south by Ephrata Township.

The community drains south to Cocalico Creek, a south-flowing tributary of the Conestoga River, which leads to the Susquehanna.

References 

Census-designated places in Lancaster County, Pennsylvania
Census-designated places in Pennsylvania
Unincorporated communities in Lancaster County, Pennsylvania
Unincorporated communities in Pennsylvania